Celaeno , designated 16 Tauri, is a star in the constellation of Taurus and a member of the Pleiades open star cluster (M45) of stars.

Properties
16 Tauri is a blue-white B-type subgiant with an apparent magnitude of +5.45. It is approximately 430 light years from the Sun; about the same distance as the Pleiades. The interstellar extinction of this star is fairly small at 0.05 magnitudes. The projected rotational velocity of the equator is 185 km/s. It is over four times the radius of the Sun and has a surface temperature of 12,800 K.

Nomenclature

16 Tauri is the star's Flamsteed designation.

It bore the traditional named Celaeno (or Celeno) and was called the "Lost Pleiad" by Theon the Younger. Celaeno was one of the Pleiades sisters in Greek mythology. In 2016, the International Astronomical Union organized a Working Group on Star Names (WGSN) to catalogue and standardize proper names for stars. The WGSN approved the name Celaeno for this star on 21 August 2016 and it is now so entered in the IAU Catalog of Star Names.

Namesake
USS Celeno (AK-76) was a United States Navy Crater class cargo ship named after the star.

References

Tauri, 016
Taurus (constellation)
B-type subgiants
Pleiades Open Cluster
Celaeno
017489
1140
023288
BD+23 505
Suspected variables